Elena Borisovna Tereshina (born 6 February 1959 in Kiev) is a Ukrainian rower. She competed in the eight for the Soviet Union at the 1980 Summer Olympics where she won the silver medal. Tereshina also won seven gold medals at the World Rowing Championships.

References 
 
 

1959 births
Living people
Russian female rowers
Soviet female rowers
Rowers at the 1980 Summer Olympics
Rowers at the 1988 Summer Olympics
Olympic silver medalists for the Soviet Union
Olympic rowers of the Soviet Union
Olympic medalists in rowing
World Rowing Championships medalists for the Soviet Union
Medalists at the 1980 Summer Olympics